Operating room management is the science of how to run an operating room suite. Operational operating room management focuses on maximizing operational efficiency at the facility, i.e. to maximize the number of surgical cases that can be done on a given day while minimizing the required resources and related costs. For example, what is the number of required anaesthetists or the scrub nurses that are needed next week to accommodate the expected workload or how can we minimize the cost of drugs used in the Operating Room? Strategic operating room management deals with long-term decision-making. For example, is it profitable to add two additional rooms to the existing facility? Typically, operating room management in profit-oriented health-care systems (e.g. United States) emphasizes strategic thinking whereas in countries with publicly funded health care (e.g. the UK), the focus is on operational decisions.

The act of coordinating and running all parts of a surgical suite to accomplish a defined set of goals. A most crucial field, operating room management is increasingly studied as how to best: 
1) ensure patient safety and optimal patient outcome, 
2) provide surgeons with appropriate access to the OR so that patients can have operations in a timely manner,
3) maximize the efficiency of operating room utilization, staff, and materials,
4) decrease patient delays,
5) enhance satisfaction among patients, staff, and surgeons.

This management science as applied to the surgical suite is gaining more attention because of increasing market pressures on hospitals from competitors (e.g., other surgical suites including office based surgery) and from payers seeking lower prices. The surgical suite is often considered a profitable hospital unit. As such, surgical suites also comprise an important fraction of hospital budget spending. Holding patient safety constant, the opportunity to increase financial gain through modifying the use of already existing resources is a prime target for managerial analysis.  Incremental improvements in operating room utilization and operating room efficiency can have major impacts on hospital staff and finances. Some hospital administrators perceive efficiency in the operating room as throughput, completing the most surgical cases within budget. Later in this article we will provide examples of tools a manager may use to analyze efficiency.

Surgical suite personnel
The management of a surgical suite must take into account all cooperating team members. The operating environment consists of interaction between surgeons, anesthesiologists, nurses, technicians, patients and visionary, committed hospital leadership.

The necessity of management
Overhead costs include, but are not limited to, the space, technology and devices, pharmaceuticals and staffing. Hospital administrators have consequently focused their attention towards maximizing OR profitability, and thereby hospital profitability, through contribution margins. This focus, in addition to the boom in demand for elective surgery, has led to a rapid growth of OR facilities. Historically, nurses have been chiefly responsible for the daily functioning of the surgical suite. Increasingly, facilities are hiring a physician medical director for the OR, as represented by a surgeon, anesthesiologist, or both. In some instances, all three branches of surgery, anesthesia, and nursing will be represented in the daily OR management infrastructure. By working collegially, these three fields can mobilize all resources necessary to maximize OR productivity. Because medical needs and regulatory requirements are constantly changing, the concept of appointing a medical director in the OR, an operating room manager, has gained acceptance.

Clinicians typically focus on operational decisions on the day of surgery (short term) such as moving cases from one OR to another, assigning and relieving staff, prioritizing urgent cases, and scheduling add-on case. On the other hand, upper management typically focuses on strategic decision making (long term) such as whether to open a new cancer center, or whether to align the hospital with a regional health care system.

Principles of operating room management
The decisions made by OR management should have a clear and definitive purpose in order to maintain consistency. In order of priority, governing principles of OR managers are to: (1) ensure patient safety and the highest quality of care; (2) provide surgeons with appropriate access to the OR; (3) maximize the efficiency of operating room utilization, staff, and materials to reduce costs; (4) decrease patient delays; and (5) enhance satisfaction among patients, staff, and physicians. If OR management is properly performed ahead of time, all that doctors and nurses have to think about on the day of surgery is the patient. If management is poor, then the medical and nursing staff may waste efforts and resources to rush cases or juggle schedules, thus compromising attention to patient safety.

Operating room utilization
OR utilization is a measure of the use of an operating room that is properly staffed with people needed to successfully deliver a surgical procedure to a patient.

Block Utilization is a measure of the use of operating room time by a surgeon or group of surgeons to whom time has been allocated.

Raw utilization is the total hours of elective cases performed within OR time divided by the hours of allocated block time.

Raw Utilization = total hours of cases performed ÷ total hours of OR time allocated

Adjusted utilization uses the total hours of elective cases performed within OR block time, including "credit" for the turnover times necessary to set up and clean up ORs.

Adjusted Utilization = [total hours of cases + "credit time"] ÷ total hours of OR time allocated

Factors affecting utilization rates include: 
the accuracy of estimated case times, 
cancellation rate, 
number of add-ons available to fill gaps, 
longest cases go first, 
the time of day as utilization typically is highest in the morning and lowest in the evening, outpatient centers have lower utilization, and other constraints (i.e., surgeon can only use room 12, or start at 11 am).

Improvements in operating room efficiency can have a major impact on hospital staff and finances as well as operating room management.

Operating room efficiency
Operating room (OR) efficiency is a measure of how well time and resources are used for their intended purposes. One way to analyze efficiency is to chart under-utilized and over-utilized time spent on a given day in the operating room. If the cases in an operating room finish earlier than scheduled, time is under-utilized. Likewise, if the cases in an operating room run "late" or past its allotted operating room time then this produces over-utilized time.

The terms operating room utilization and operating room productivity are also often used when discussing operating room management of a surgical suite.

Performance dashboard for a surgical suite
An operating room manager must select criteria, key performance indicators, or a dashboard of measurements, to assess overall functioning of a surgical suite. An example of an analytic tool used to rate surgical suites is reflected below. This scoring system was created in order to quantify the efficiency levels of surgical suites. Its economical efficacy has yet to be validated by formal studies. In addition, it was developed in the US and contains scoring elements that are applicable for an American surgical suite. It is therefore unlikely to be useful for operating room managers outside the US.

OR efficiency measurements

The above objective criteria can be computed from data commonly available in hospital administrative data systems.

Excess staffing costs
Nothing is more important than to first allocate the right amount of OR time to each service on each day of the week for their case scheduling. This is not the same as the block time! To illustrate this imagine that two cases each lasting two hours are scheduled into OR #1 with OR nurses and an anesthesiologist scheduled to work an eight-hour day. The matching of workload to staffing has been so poor that little can be done the day of surgery to increase the efficiency of use of the staff. Neither awakening patients more quickly nor reducing the turnover time, for example, will compensate for the poor initial choice of staffing for OR #1 and/or how the cases were scheduled into OR #1.

Optimal allocation of OR time should be based on historical use by a particular service (i.e., unit of OR allocation such as surgeon, group, department, or specialty) and then using computer software to minimize the amount of underutilized time and the more expensive overutilized time. Under-utilized hours reflect how early the room finishes. In the example above, if staff were scheduled to work from 7:00 am to 3:00 pm and instead the room finished at 11 am, then there would be 4 hours of underutilized time. The excess staffing cost would be 50% (4 hours/8 hours). On the other hand, if 9 hours of cases are performed in an OR with staff scheduled to work 8 hours then the excess staffing cost is 25%. Over-utilized hours are the hours that ORs run longer than the regularly scheduled OR hours, or 1 hr in this example. 1hr/8hr=12.5% which is then multiplied by the additional cost of staying late, which often is assumed to be a factor of two (related to monetary overtime cost paid to staff, as well as recruitment and retention costs related to unhappy staff because they have to stay late unpredictably).
OR suites can reasonably aim to achieve a staffing cost that is within 10% of optimal (i.e., workload is perfectly matched to staffing).

If the key is to allocate appropriate time to each service based on historical OR use, how do you deal with rooms consistently running late on the day of surgery?  The answer: make the allocated time, into which cases are being scheduled, longer.  For example, if a surgeon does 12 hours worth of cases every day he is in the OR, do not plan 8 hours of staffing (7am-3pm) and have everyone frustrated by having to stay late (overtime). Rather, schedule his cases into 12 hours of allocated time (7am-7pm). That way, anesthesia and nursing staff know they will be there 12 hours when they arrive to work and overtime costs (financial and morale) will be reduced. The common response to this approach is, “No one wants to be there till 7 pm.” The answer to that is, “You are there now till 7 pm so why not make scheduled OR time 12 hr long and have a more predictable work day duration.”  Thus, optimizing staffing costs is finding balance between overtime and finishing early.

There may be concern about a nurse manager's ability to flex the staff enough to avoid excess staffing costs. It can be difficult from a human resources standpoint to match scheduled cases with staffing perfectly, such that staff still get the hours and shifts they need. For example, if Dr Smith needs a 12-hour block, the manager needs to find staff who want to work a 12-hour shift (or part-timers in some combination).  Staffing is not only an OR efficiency issue, but a staff satisfaction issue. It can be a challenge at a time when recruiting and retaining nurses are growing concerns.

Start-time tardiness
Start-time tardiness is the mean tardiness of start times for elective cases per OR per day. Reducing the time patients have to wait for their surgery once they arrive to the hospital (especially if the preceding case runs late) is another important goal for the OR manager. If a case is supposed to start at 10:00 am (patient enters OR), but the case starts at 10:30 am instead, then there are 30 minutes of tardiness.  In computing this metric, no credit is given if the 10:00 am case starts early (for example at 9:45 am).

The tardiness of start of scheduled cases should total less than 45 mins per eight-hour OR day in well functioning OR suites.  Facilities with long work days will have greater tardiness because the longer the day, the more uncertainty about case start times. Having patients’ medical records ready to go with all needed documents is essential for on time starts.

Case cancellation rate on day of surgery
Cancellation rates vary among facilities, depending partly on the types of patients receiving care, ranging from 4.6% for outpatients, to 13% -18% at VA medical centers. Recently published data from the UK estimate that 1 in 10 patients presenting for inpatient surgery have experienced a previous cancellation for their procedure, and that 1 in 7 patients being operated on had their procedure cancelled during a 1-week period in March 2017 in the UK National Health Service (NHS).  Many cancellations are due to non-medical problems such as a full ICU, surgeon unavailability, or bad weather. OR cancellation rates can be monitored statistically. Well functioning OR suites should have cancellation rates less than 5%. Monitoring the cancellations correctly is calculated by taking the ratio of the number of cancellations to the number of scheduled cases.

PACU admission delays
PACU admission delays can be expressed as a % of workdays with at least one delay of 10 mins or greater in PACU admission because PACU is full. It is important to adjust PACU nurse staffing around the times of OR admissions. Algorithms exist that use the number of available nursing hours to find the staffing solution with the fewest understaffed days.

Contribution margin per OR hour
An OR suite that puts up with excessive surgical times can schedule itself efficiently but still lose its financial shirt if many surgeons are slow, use too many instruments, or expensive implants, etc. These are all measured by the contribution margin per OR hr. The contribution margin per hour of OR time is the hospital revenue generated by a surgical case, less all the hospitalization variable labor and supply costs. Variable costs, such as implants, vary directly with the volume of cases performed.

This is because fee-for-service hospitals have a positive contribution margin for almost all elective cases mostly due to a large percentage of OR costs being fixed. For USA hospitals not on a fixed annual budget, contribution margin per OR hour averages one to two thousand USD per OR hour.

Turnover times
Turnover time is the time from when one patient exits an OR until the next patient enters the same OR. Turnover times include cleanup times and setup times, but not delays between cases. Based on data collected at 31 USA hospitals, turnover times at the best performing OR suites average less than 25 mins. Cost reduction from reducing turnover times (because OR workload is less) can only be achieved if OR allocations and staffing are reduced. Despite this, turnover time receives much attention from OR managers because it is a key satisfier for surgeons.

Sometimes the OR suite reduces turnover times (by providing more staff to clean the room for example) but new problems arise (not enough time for sterilizing instruments for the new case, can't bring patient to PACU because no beds) that were “hidden” by long turnover times.

Times between cases that are longer than a defined interval (e.g., 1 hr because to follow surgeon is unavailable) should be considered delays, not turnovers.

Prediction bias
Prediction bias in case duration are expressed as estimates per 8 hr of OR time. Prediction error equals the actual duration of the new case minus the estimated duration of the new case. Bias indicates whether the estimate is consistently too high or consistently too low, and precision reflects the magnitudes of the errors of the estimates.  Efficient OR suites should aim to have bias in case duration estimates per 8 hr of OR time that is less than 15 minutes.    A reason for bias can be surgeons’ consistently shortening their case duration estimates because they have too little OR time allocated and need to “fit” their list of cases into the OR time they do have. In contrast, other OR suites may have surgeons that purposely overestimate case durations to keep control/access of their allocated OR time so that if a new case appears their OR time was not given away.

Remember that lack of historical case duration data for scheduled procedures is an important cause of inaccuracy in predicting case duration.  In general, half of the cases scheduled in your OR suite tomorrow will have less than five previous cases of the same procedure type and same surgeon during the preceding year.

It would be nice to have no uncertainty in case duration prediction. But, it is present. The problem is looking for a single number that is correct most of the time.  You won't get accurate estimates by using historical case duration data. Rather, from the historical data you'll get an assessment of the uncertainty.

Prolonged turnovers
Times between cases that are longer than a defined interval. (note: late arrival of a surgeon should be considered delays, not turnovers.)

Operating room productivity
Operating room productivity is the quantity and quality of output (typically surgical cases) from the surgical suite in contrast to the amount of input required (such as physicians and nurses and equipment for example). Many institutions believe that productivity (output/input) can be accomplished without sacrificing convenience (rapid access to open OR time such that a surgeon can book a case without having to wait) but these two aspects are not separable.

Typically, the greater the operating room utilization, the less the convenience (able to book cases when desired) as defined by surgeons and patients. This is because as utilization goes up there is less available open staffed OR time available on short notice. In other words, the greater the access and convenience, the lower is operating room utilization (because of the need for extra capacity), at least as perceived by hospitals and anesthesiologists. This high level of customer service of being able to book cases on short notice is one reason ambulatory surgery centers typically have lower OR utilization than big city hospitals.  The outpatient surgery center usually has reduced overhead when compared to a big city hospital, and therefore can financially get away with lower OR use.

Sociopolitical factors in management of the surgery suite: "OR Equilibrium"
Management of the operating room suite must acknowledge that people are the primary resource.  Although management science theory may tend to hold constant the preferences and bias of the individuals working in and utilizing the surgery suite, management of the surgical suite with regards to case scheduling is strongly influenced by personal, political, and economic relationships within an institution.

Who is the main customer of your surgical suite?
To best align management goals with institutional objectives the OR director needs to identify the primary customer of the surgical suite. An OR can be completely balanced or it can be biased to one or more its constituents. The main people to consider are surgeons, anesthesiologists, nurses, the hospital (upper management), and of course the patient.

A first step is to determine whose preferences or workload dominates the surgical suite. If surgeons are in large demand with small supply, then that may outweigh other interests. For example, a private facility may have surgeons who can pull their patients to another hospital if made to wait. As another example, in a private surgeon-owned surgery center, management may be directed as maintaining a particular partner's workload and the incentives are to schedule his/her cases with priority.

The same supply/demand balance applies to anesthesia. The situation may exist where a specific surgery group will only work with its contracted anesthesia group.  In this case, a manager may have to wait until the contracted anesthesiologist is ready for the case, even if this means idle OR time. This can be avoided in institutions where one group has exclusive rights and controls anesthesia privilege over all the ORs. This arrangement is seen commonly because it eliminates factions and streamlines anesthesia placement for cases, either elective or emergency.

Hospital (Upper Management) run ORs are identified by those facilities where the hospital executives acting as agents for government authorities determine staffing and workload. Examples include hospitals in public health care systems like in European countries or the VA United States Department of Veteran Affairs in the USA.

In other surgical suites, in contrast, management decisions have patients as the first priority.  Facilities performing elective cosmetic procedures for cash reimbursement are an example. Due to the patient being able to choose where they have plastic surgery, patients expect special circumstances such as first-rate customer service. Additionally, if a patient is one hour late for surgery the patient will most likely still be able to undergo surgery. This concept is in contrast to a large academic hospital, for example, where a patient who misses their check-in window for elective surgery is often removed from the surgery schedule to make room for re-shuffled elective and emergency cases.

What are the preferences of the main customer in the surgical suite?
Once the manager has identified the critical few customers and the necessary many customers, then the next step is to determine their preferences and incentives. Surgeons will favor early block surgery times, rapid turnover, low cancellation rates, and on time starts. The hospital (upper management) will want the most surgical output with the least associated cost. Patients will likely favor reduced waiting times for surgery start. Finally, nurse managers and anesthesiologists will be inclined to high operating room utilization, minimal overtime, the flexibility to move cases around, and reserve capacity in the ORs.

Much like economic Game Theory, agents in the OR will position their interests in a nature as to maximize their returns. It is up to the OR manager to weigh the contributions of each agent and provide enough OR time and resources to maximize the output of the surgical suite in its entirety.

Theory and applications of operating room management
This discussion addresses capitalistic healthcare markets. A discussion of socialized medicine would include several other factors which influence the supply and demand for surgical care.  Analysis of operating room management within socialized medicine is becoming increasingly frequent in the medical literature, but is beyond the scope of this article.

A manager must select benchmarks in order to analyze changes from baseline operations. Upgrades to existing operating infrastructures should be demonstrated as efficiency gained compared to baseline practices. Management criteria must therefore include preoperative, intraoperative, and immediate postoperative system analysis.

Preoperative management issues
Waiting time and operating room scheduling are the two key preoperative determinates.

Waiting time prior to operation The time from surgical scheduling to check-in for the procedure is defined, for these purposes, as “preoperative wait time.”

Use of a surgical suite depends greatly on, and increases as, the average length of time patients wait for surgery increases. As waiting time increases, more surgical dates (blocks) can be evaluated for a good match between a case's duration and the open times in the blocks. In some communities, competition among surgeons and hospitals may not allow the average length of time that patients have to wait for surgery to be as long as 2 weeks. An OR suite then cannot expect block time utilization from elective cases to exceed 90%, assuming that enough block time is allocated for a surgeon to complete all of the elective cases in the block time.

For these purposes, wait time can be equated to the price of an object. The price for an object increases if demand increases and/or supply reduces for that object. Hence, “preoperative wait time” will increase as demand for surgery increases and/or surgical supply (operating room availability) reduces or fails to grow proportionally to surgical demand.

By accurately gauging a patient population and an operative facility's capacity, an effective manager can minimize the wait for elective and imminent procedures while covering all emergency cases and without overextending the operative team.

Scheduling operating room calendars
Case scheduling or correctly selecting the day on which to do each elective case so as to best fill the allocated hours is most important, much more so than, for example, correcting errors in predicting how long elective or add-on cases would last, reducing variability in turnover or delays between cases, or day-to-day variation in hours of add-on cases.

Poor scheduling is often the cause of lost OR time. To more efficiently operate a surgical setting, managers may consider centralizing all scheduling to the operating room suite itself.  Ideally, holding patient and surgeon preferences constant, an operating facility can identify cases and appropriately place them into predetermined time slots, or blocks.

To examine scheduling challenges, consider three possible surgical scenarios: elective (e.g. cosmetic procedures, stable situations not increasing in severity), imminent (e.g. inflamed gall bladder removal, potential for worsening harm if situations not surgically corrected,) and emergency surgeries (e.g. burst appendix, situations in which death or disability is possible or likely). The majority of operative time is a combination of elective and imminent surgeries. Albeit a smaller percentage, emergency surgical cases must always be handled promptly in order to ensure patient safety. Emergency surgeries are often unforeseeable and present a scheduling challenge as a result.  Therefore, from a management perspective, one must use the elective and imminent surgical cases as a guideline for pre-determining operative schedules, while allowing flexibility for the emergency situations that indubitably arise.

The historical approach for scheduling operating room time is via analysis of previous surgical information. For example, to estimate how much time a cholecystectomy will require, the management determines how long previous cholecystectomy operations took the participating surgeon. Limiting this approach is the number of prior recorded cases and the surgeon's familiarity with the procedure.  Previously recorded information serves to set a precedent for turnover rates. By allowing surgeons to operate efficiently based on their previous timetables, a manager allows all parties involved to work more efficiently.

Nothing is more important than to first allocate the right amount of OR time to each service on each day of the week so that rarely do services fill their allocated OR time and have another case to schedule. This allocation is based on historical use by surgeon and then using computer to minimize ratio of underutilized time and over-utilized time (which is more expensive).

A prevailing school of thought is for managers to allocate operating room time based on the principles of safety, access and operating room efficiency, in respective order of importance.  Part of a manager's job is to clearly communicate these factors to all parties involved in care delivery.

There are times when a departmental manager must realize a departure from this practice and intervene to save profitability margins. For instance, an anesthesia practice group may negotiate extra funds from their employer (university, hospital, multi-specialty medical groups) to compensate for underutilized operating room time.  In this instance, an anesthesia manager may use predetermined formulas to estimate excess labor costs they incur that are not offset by proper operating room utilization. A manager, whether departmental of administrative, that uses proactive applications can eliminate inefficiencies within their operating systems.

Intraoperative management issues
Managers need to evaluate: 1) operating room leadership; 2) departmental leadership within the operating room; 3) interpersonal conflicts amongst the operating team; 4) physical layout and location of the operating room in relation to other integral departments; 5) operating room communication systems; and 6) patient turnover.

Only then can options such as providing rewards and incentives for improved operating room efficiency, assessing logistical and system design, delegating responsibility, and implementing teamwork initiatives be instituted to produce more favorable outcomes for both the provider and the patient.

Surgical suite leadership
Generally, an institution or private surgery center will have an agreed upon leader, generally dubbed the “Operating Room Manager.” The reporting structure is typically to a VP of surgical services. A manager may have the business and academic ability to operate a facility, but without the cooperation of staff and practitioners, most reform efforts will be futile.

An OR manager must be in compliance with several internal and external governing bodies. Depending on the institution, a given manager may have to work closely with committees ranging from patient safety and medical staff safety boards to an auxiliary OR committee.  The Joint Commission on Accreditation of Healthcare Organizations (JCAHO) and the Centers for Medicare and Medicaid Services (CMS) puts forth an external, universal regulatory standard for hospitals and ORs. An OR manager must maintain compliance with this spectrum of policies in order to maintain both patient safety as well as hospital accreditation.
One of many notable policies put forth by JHACO [Joint Commission] is the universal protocol, implemented to ensure patient safety. This protocol requires that three sequential events must be completed prior to surgical incision in order to reduce iatrogenic errors and postoperative complications. The three checkpoints are (1) preoperative verification of procedure and background information, (2) marking of the operative site with a marker and surgeon's initials, and (3) an official timeout for an audible confirmation of patient identity and the procedure to be completed. These regulations have proven to reduce avoidable complications of intraoperative mistakes and resultant postoperative morbidities and mortalities.

Departmental leadership within the surgical suite
This topic compartmentalizes each member of a surgical suite team to his/her department (e.g. surgery, anesthesiology, environmental services, housekeeping, etc.). The principle behind departmental leadership is the delegation of responsibility. An operating room manager must rely upon departments to uphold their respective regulations in addition to acting in the best interest of the overall institution. This interest directly relates to operating room utilization and operating room productivity. Therefore, a surgical chief must be an active member of scheduling block time for surgery in order to avoid persistent over or underutilization of resources.

Interpersonal conflicts amongst the surgical suite team
The majority of accidents in technical professions have human error as causal elements. More critically, these errors tend to involve interpersonal issues: communications, leadership, conflict, flawed decision making, etc.  A questionnaire circulated to operating room staff and professionals identified communication problems as an overwhelming barrier to operating room performance. This problem is a constant theme within healthcare and can disrupt an operating room and detract from operating room efficiency.  It is imperative that a manager optimize personal issues and act quickly to correct them.

Physical layout and location of the surgical suite in relation to other integral departments (i.e. radiology, pathology, etc.)
An effective manager must analyze the layout of each operating room individually and as a whole. The mass of new technologies and equipment, such as Endoscopic surgical procedures, in today's operating room is increasing. Crowding may adversely affect the abilities of the surgical team.  Managers must act to appropriately modify pre-existing operating room space or by identifying key design issues during the conception and building of new facilities. Larger cases where more materials and instruments are used should be appropriately scheduled into rooms that can accommodate them.

Likewise, the surgical suite ideally is placed in close proximity to support functions such as radiology, pathology, and intensive care.  Creating unnecessary distance between these entities compromises both operating room efficiency and patient safety.

Surgical Suite Communication Systems and Patient Turnover

Current technologies provide managers with tools to reduce patient turnover rate. Standard practices include passive status displays (whiteboards or screens in the surgical suites) and active displays (text pager notifications). These communication tools streamline interdisciplinary planning for real time decision-making. A recent study suggests going further and implementing a system of command displays (text suggestions of how to act) or even patient tracking systems such as with RFID tags.  This communication is essential to know when to expect patients to arrive to the holding area prior to entering the OR, or to the recovery room after surgery.

Reduction in turnover time (patient exists operating room until next patient enters operating room) requires all individuals in the surgical suite to work together.  The day-to-day management of operating room efficiency is integral to the maximization of both qualitative (improved professional satisfaction) and quantitative (completion of more cases and reduced staffing costs) returns.

Postoperative operating room management
Surgical Care Improvement Project (SCIP)

SCIP is a national partnership of organizations [www.medqic.org/scip] that are dedicated to reducing postoperative complications.

The project focuses on four broad areas in which the incidence and cost of complications are high: (1) Surgical site infections, (2) Perioperative myocardial infarctions (heart attacks), (3) Venous thromboembolism, and (4) Postoperative pneumonia.

An operating room manager must consider the preoperative, intraoperative and postoperative factors which reflect in patient safety and hospital efficiency.  Ideally, a manager is approachable, intelligent, and an effective leader who communicates well with hospital staff. The above techniques and principles highlight many of the ways in which a manager can successfully direct a surgical suite to maximize its benefit to the patients, staff and hospital.

Notes
1. One possible solution to intrapersonal conflict within the operating theatre is medical simulation training. Large institutions are adapting simulator practices to teach everything from communication skills to proper clinical management of crises situations. By identifying interpersonal barriers in a closed environment, a manager can work with all parties involved to address and resolve these problems. Such interventions will reduce intraoperative error as a result of personal conflicts and serve to increase efficiency.

2.  Ultimately, a manager may improve hospital functioning by providing rewards and incentives for improved efficiency, assessing logistical and system design, delegating responsibility, and implementing teamwork initiatives.  These topics are beyond the scope of this article.

3. Those seeking to learn more about operating room management may find Dr. Franklin Dexter's website of help: 

4. Interested persons may also explore topics in administrative structure and supply chain management.

References

Health care management
Surgery